

2014

References

See also
 2014 in Australia
 2014 in Australian television
 List of 2014 box office number-one films in Australia

2014
Lists of 2014 films by country or language
Films